Maryada...Lekin Kab Tak? (Keeping our limits...but until when?) is an Indian television drama that premiered on 18 October 2010 and ended on 13 April 2012 on Star Plus. The show is produced by Tony and Deeya Singh of DJ's a Creative Unit.

The show centered on the lives of four women from the same family: Priya, Devyani(eventually Priya's mother-in-law), Uttara(Devyani's sister) and Vidya. Initially, it focused on the character of Uttara and the trials she faced in her abusive marriage to her drunkard husband. The show later revolved around Brahmanand Jakhar, Uttara's brother-in-law, and Uttara's betrayal to her sister by marrying Brahma religiously.

Plot
Uttara Bindra is married to Rishabh Raheja, and has a teenage daughter Tara. Rishabh gets mad after an accident and starts beating Uttara, that leads her to send Tara to hostel to prevent her from seeing Rishabh's abuse. Still in danger, Uttara is consoled and saved by her elder sister Devyani, and ends up killing Rishabh. She is freed of all charges by Devyani's corrupt and immoral husband SSP Brahmanand Jakhar, who also takes bribes.

Uttara is welcomed in Jakhar house, against Tara's wish. Everyone is aware of Brahma's cheating and womanizing sins except his and Devyani's son, Aditya. In past, Brahma had also tried to molest Priya Pradhan, that caused a major change in her personality. However, Aditya had fell in love with Priya and made her smile again, finally saving and marrying her. Priya also decides to fight against Brahma's evil actions & rile Devyani against him. Shocking twist when Uttara and Brahma start falling in love, and begin an affair. Uttara later regrets so.

Devyani finally learns about their affair. Brahma marries Uttara illegally; she takes Devyani's place and they also consummate their marriage. Uttara disbelieves when she warns her of Brahma's corrupt practices and womanizing tendencies. Brahma threatens to divorce Devyani and wed Uttara, to control her, but Devyani makes Brahma enraged as she goes ahead with the divorce, revealing all of his crimes in court due to which the CM gives a suspension threat.

Later, Uttara too decides to leave him when it is revealed that Brahma's crimes will be taken to a criminal court of law. Shocked and finally, Aditya realizes Brahma's evil truth and disowns him. Blaming Priya for all this, Brahma kidnaps and tries to rape her but gets arrested. The family and Tara forgives Uttara for her deeds but later the whole family finds out, Uttara is pregnant with Brahma's child, though Tara is still unaware of the pregnancy. Broken and mentally disabled, Brahma is back. Uttara plans to become the DIG of Haryana, leaving causes Brahma frustrated and he dies in a car accident.

1 year later

Devyani, Aditya and Priya are living peacefully. Aditya is a hugely successful party leader of his political party. Pregnant, Priya is a successful lawyer. Uttara has delivered Shravan, her and Brahma's son who becomes heir to Brahma's fortune.

Cast

Main
 Raqesh Bapat as Aditya Brahmanand Jakhar: Brahma and Devyani's son; Uttara's nephew and stepson; Gaurav's brother; Tara and Shravan's cousin and half-brother; Priya's husband (2010–2012)
 Ridhi Dogra as Priya Prabhat Pradhan/Priya Aditya Jakhar: Prabhat's daughter; Aditya's wife (2010–2012)

Recurring
 Indrani Halder Ghosh as Devyani Bindra/Devyani Brahmanand Jakhar: Uttara's sister; Brahma's first wife; Aditya and Gaurav’s mother; Tara and Shravan's aunt (2010–2012)
 Kamya Panjabi as Uttara Bindra/Uttara Rishabh Raheja/Uttara Brahmanand Jakhar: Devyani's sister; Rishabh's murderer and former wife; Brahma's second wife; Tara and Shravan's mother; Aditya and Gaurav's aunt and stepmother (2010–2012)
 Unknown as Shravan Brahmanand Jakhar: Uttara and Brahma's son; Devyani's nephew and stepson; Tara, Aditya and Gaurav's half-brother (2012)
 Vishwajeet Pradhan as Brahmanand "Brahma" Jakhar: Devyani and Uttara's husband; Gaurav, Aditya and Shravan's father; Tara's uncle and stepfather (2010–2012)
 Vindhya Tiwari as Vidya Gaurav Jakhar: Gaurav's wife (2010–2012)
 Dakssh Ajit Singh as Gaurav Brahmanand Jakhar: Brahma and Devyani's son; Uttara's nephew and stepson; Aditya's brother; Tara and Shravan's cousin and half-brother; Karan's gay lover; Vidya’s husband (2010–2012)
 Navika Kotia as Tara Rishabh Raheja: Rishabh and Uttara's daughter; Devyani's niece; Brahma's stepdaughter; Aditya, Gaurav and Shravan's cousin and half-sister (2010–2012)
 Sushil Parashar as Prabhat Pradhan: Priya's father (2010–2012)
 Karan Singh as Karan Roy: Gaurav’s gay lover and boyfriend (2010–2012)
 Nivin Ramani as Cheenu/Gagan pradhan
 Arun Bali as Baauji
 Shashwita Sharma as Imli
 Fenil Umrigar as Sweety
 Amit Dhawan as Rishabh Raheja: Uttara's former husband; Tara's father (2010)
 Diwakar Pundir
 Nishant Tanwar, Vidya's Brother
 Mona Ambegaonkar, Karan's Mother

Guests
Abhishek Bachchan as ACP Vishnu Kamat: To promote his film Dum Maaro Dum (2011)
Rana Daggubati as Joki Fernandez: To promote his film Dum Maaro Dum (2011)

Reception

Critics
The series is remembered as the first show on Indian television to have a gay storyline shown crucial screenspace.

The Indian Express quoted the series as 'Bold and edgy' saying, "What works for the story is each episode is reasonably fast paced and has tension writ all over it. The performances especially by the four women are good. The men put in decent performances. It shows you a different side to women who are probably in every other family carrying their own crosses!"

Ratings
The series which was aired initially at a late night slot of 11:30 pm and shifted to 11:00 pm (IST) in March 2011, had a good viewership in its slot. In its first month of telecast, the series garnered 1 TVR. In May 2011 it rose to 1.2 TVR after the introduction of homosexuality track while during July in week 29 of 2011, it spiked to 1.8 TVR and in November 2011 it was garnering 1.6 TVR.

References

External links

StarPlus original programming
2010 Indian television series debuts
Indian television soap operas
2012 Indian television series endings
Indian LGBT-related television shows
2010s LGBT-related drama television series